[[File:Set of curves Outer approximation.png|345px|thumb|right|Tolerance function (turquoise) and interval-valued approximation (red)]]
Interval arithmetic (also known as interval mathematics, interval analysis, or interval computation) is a mathematical technique used to mitigate rounding and measurement errors in mathematical computation by computing function bounds. Numerical methods involving interval arithmetic can guarantee reliable and mathematically correct results. Instead of representing a value as a single number, interval arithmetic represents each value as a range of possibilities.

Mathematically, instead of working with an uncertain real-valued variable , interval arithmetic works with an interval  that defines the range of values that  can have.

Interval arithmetic is suitable for a variety of purposes; the most common use is in scientific works, particularly when the calculations are handled by software, where it is used to keep track of rounding errors in calculations and of uncertainties in the knowledge of the exact values of physical and technical parameters. The latter often arise from measurement errors and tolerances for components or due to limits on computational accuracy. Interval arithmetic also helps find guaranteed solutions to equations (such as differential equations) and optimization problems.

Introduction
The main objective of interval arithmetic is to provide a simple way of calculating upper and lower bounds of a function's range in one or more variables. These endpoints are not necessarily the true supremum or infimum, since the precise calculation of those values can be difficult or impossible; the bounds only need to contain the function's range as a subset.

This treatment is typically limited to real intervals, so quantities in the form

Since a real number  can be interpreted as the interval  intervals and real numbers can be freely combined.

Example

Consider the calculation of a person's body mass index (BMI). BMI is calculated as a person's body weight in kilograms divided by the square of their height in meters. Suppose a person uses a scale that has a precision of one kilogram, where intermediate values cannot be discerned, and the true weight is rounded to the nearest whole number. For example, 79.6 kg and 80.3kg are indistinguishable, as the scale can only display values to the nearest kilogram. It is unlikely that when the scale reads 80kg, the person has a weight of exactly 80.0kg. Thus, the scale displaying 80kg indicates a weight between 79.5kg and 80.5kg, or the interval .

The BMI of a man who weighs 80kg and is 1.80m tall is approximately 24.7. A weight of 79.5kg and the same height yields a BMI of 24.537, while a weight of 80.5kg yields 24.846. Since the body mass is continuous and always increasing for all values within the specified weight interval, the true BMI must lie within the interval . Since the entire interval is less than 25, which is the cutoff between normal and excessive weight, it can be concluded with certainty that the man is of normal weight.

The error in this example does not affect the conclusion (normal weight), but this is not generally true. If the man were slightly heavier, the BMI's range may include the cutoff value of 25. In such a case, the scale's precision would be insufficient to make a definitive conclusion.

 Multiple intervals 

Height and body weight both affect the value of the BMI. Though the example above only considered variation in weight, height is also subject to uncertainty. Height measurements in meters are usually rounded to the nearest centimeter: a recorded measurement of 1.79 meters represents a height in the interval . Since the BMI uniformly increases with respect to weight and decreases with respect to height, the error interval can be calculated by substituting the lowest and highest values of each interval, and then selecting the lowest and highest results as boundaries.  The BMI must therefore exist in the interval

In this case, the man may have normal weight or be overweight; the weight and height measurements were insufficiently precise to make a definitive conclusion.

 Interval operators 
A binary operation  on two intervals, such as addition or multiplication is defined by

If  is monotone for each operand on the intervals, which is the case for the four basic arithmetic operations (except division when the denominator contains ), the extreme values occur at the endpoints of the operand intervals. Writing out all combinations, one way of stating this is

For practical applications this can be simplified further:

 Addition: 
 Subtraction: 
 Multiplication: 
 Division:  where 

More generally, when working with discontinuous functions, it is sometimes useful to do the calculation with so-called multi-intervals of the form  The corresponding multi-interval arithmetic maintains a set of (usually disjoint) intervals and also provides for overlapping intervals to unite.

Interval multiplication often only requires two multiplications. If ,  are nonnegative,

The multiplication can be interpreted as the area of a rectangle with varying edges. The result interval covers all possible areas, from smallest to the largest.

With the help of these definitions, it is already possible to calculate the range of simple functions, such as  For example, if ,  and :

Notation
To shorten the notation of intervals, brackets can be used.

 can be used to represent an interval. Note that in such a compact notation,  should not be confused between a single-point interval  and a general interval. For the set of all intervals, we can use

as an abbreviation.  For a vector of intervals  we can use a bold font: .

Elementary functions

Interval functions beyond the four basic operators may also be defined.

For monotonic functions in one variable, the range of values is simple to compute. If  is monotonically increasing (resp. decreasing) in the interval  then for all  such that   (resp. ).

The range corresponding to the interval  can be therefore calculated by applying the function to its endpoints:

From this, the following basic features for interval functions can easily be defined:

 Exponential function:  for 
 Logarithm:  for positive intervals  and 
 Odd powers: , for odd 

For even powers, the range of values being considered is important, and needs to be dealt with before doing any multiplication. For example,  for  should produce the interval  when  But if  is taken by repeating interval multiplication of form   then the result is  wider than necessary.

More generally one can say that, for piecewise monotonic functions, it is sufficient to consider the endpoints , of an interval, together with the so-called critical points within the interval, being those points where the monotonicity of the function changes direction. Thus, only up to five points within an interval need to be considered, as the resulting interval is  if the interval includes at least two extrema. For sine and cosine, only the endpoints need full evaluation, as the critical points lead to easily pre-calculated values—namely -1, 0, and 1.

Interval extensions of general functions
In general, it may not be easy to find such a simple description of the output interval for many functions.  But it may still be possible to extend functions to interval arithmetic. If  is a function from a real vector to a real number, then  is called an interval extension of  if

This definition of the interval extension does not give a precise result. Tighter extensions are desirable, though the relative costs of calculation and imprecision should be considered; in this case,  should be chosen as it gives the tightest possible result.

Given a real expression, its natural interval extension is achieved by using the interval extensions of each of its subexpressions, functions and operators.

The Taylor interval extension (of degree  ) is a  times differentiable function  defined by

Usually one chooses  to be the midpoint of the interval and uses the natural interval extension to assess the remainder.

The special case of the Taylor interval extension of degree  is also referred to as the mean value form.

Complex interval arithmetic
An interval can be defined as a set of points within a specified from the center, and this definition can be extended from real numbers to complex numbers. Another extension defines intervals as rectangles in the complex plane. As it is the case with computing with real numbers, computing with complex numbers involves uncertain data. So, given the fact that an interval number is a real closed interval and a complex number is an ordered pair of real numbers, there is no reason to limit the application of interval arithmetic to the measure of uncertainties in computations with real numbers. Interval arithmetic can thus be extended, via complex interval numbers, to determine regions of uncertainty in computing with complex numbers. One can either define complex interval arithmetic using rectangles or using disks, both with their respective advantages and disadvantages.

The basic algebraic operations for real interval numbers (real closed intervals) can be extended to complex numbers. It is therefore not surprising that complex interval arithmetic is similar to, but not the same as, ordinary complex arithmetic. It can be shown that, as it is the case with real interval arithmetic, there is no distributivity between addition and multiplication of complex interval numbers except for certain special cases, and inverse elements do not always exist for complex interval numbers. Two other useful properties of ordinary complex arithmetic fail to hold in complex interval arithmetic: the additive and multiplicative properties, of ordinary complex conjugates, do not hold for complex interval conjugates.

Interval arithmetic can be extended, in an analogous manner, to other multidimensional number systems such as quaternions and octonions, but with the expense that we have to sacrifice other useful properties of ordinary arithmetic.

Interval methods
 
The methods of classical numerical analysis cannot be transferred one-to-one into interval-valued algorithms, as dependencies between numerical values are usually not taken into account.

Rounded interval arithmetic

To work effectively in a real-life implementation, intervals must be compatible with floating point computing.  The earlier operations were based on exact arithmetic, but in general fast numerical solution methods may not be available for it.  The range of values of the function 
Where the same calculation is done with single digit precision, the result would normally be . But ,
so this approach would contradict the basic principles of interval arithmetic, as a part of the domain of  would be lost. Instead, the outward rounded solution  is used.

The standard IEEE 754 for binary floating-point arithmetic also sets out procedures for the implementation of rounding.  An IEEE 754 compliant system allows programmers to round to the nearest floating-point number; alternatives are rounding towards 0 (truncating), rounding toward positive infinity (i.e., up), or rounding towards negative infinity (i.e., down).

The required external rounding for interval arithmetic can thus be achieved by changing the rounding settings of the processor in the calculation of the upper limit (up) and lower limit (down). Alternatively, an appropriate small interval  can be added.

Dependency problem

The so-called "dependency" problem is a major obstacle to the application of interval arithmetic. Although interval methods can determine the range of elementary arithmetic operations and functions very accurately, this is not always true with more complicated functions. If an interval occurs several times in a calculation using parameters, and each occurrence is taken independently, then this can lead to an unwanted expansion of the resulting intervals.

As an illustration, take the function  defined by  The values of this function over the interval  are  As the natural interval extension, it is calculated as:

So the suitable interval calculation is

and gives the correct values.

In general, it can be shown that the exact range of values can be achieved, if each variable appears only once and if  is continuous inside the box. However, not every function can be rewritten this way.

The dependency of the problem causing over-estimation of the value range can go as far as covering a large range, preventing more meaningful conclusions.

An additional increase in the range stems from the solution of areas that do not take the form of an interval vector. The solution set of the linear system

is precisely the line between the points  and  Using interval methods results in the unit square,  This is known as the wrapping effect.

Linear interval systems
A linear interval system consists of a matrix interval extension  and an interval vector . We want the smallest cuboid , for all vectors
.

For quadratic systems – in other words, for  – there can be such an interval vector , which covers all possible solutions, found simply with the interval Gauss method.  This replaces the numerical operations, in that the linear algebra method known as Gaussian elimination becomes its interval version.  However, since this method uses the interval entities and  repeatedly in the calculation, it can produce poor results for some problems. Hence using the result of the interval-valued Gauss only provides first rough estimates, since although it contains the entire solution set, it also has a large area outside it.

A rough solution  can often be improved by an interval version of the Gauss–Seidel method.
The motivation for this is that the -th row of the interval extension of the linear equation.

can be determined by the variable  if the division  is allowed.  It is therefore simultaneously.
So we can now replace  by
,
and so the vector  by each element.
Since the procedure is more efficient for a diagonally dominant matrix, instead of the system  one can often try multiplying it by an appropriate rational matrix   with the resulting matrix equation.

left to solve. If one chooses, for example,  for the central matrix , then  is outer extension of the identity matrix.

These methods only work well if the widths of the intervals occurring are sufficiently small.  For wider intervals it can be useful to use an interval-linear system on finite (albeit large) real number equivalent linear systems. If all the matrices  are invertible, it is sufficient to consider all possible combinations (upper and lower) of the endpoints occurring in the intervals.  The resulting problems can be resolved using conventional numerical methods. Interval arithmetic is still used to determine rounding errors.

This is only suitable for systems of smaller dimension, since with a fully occupied  matrix,  real matrices need to be inverted, with  vectors for the right-hand side.  This approach was developed by Jiri Rohn and is still being developed.

Interval Newton method

An interval variant of Newton's method for finding the zeros in an interval vector  can be derived from the average value extension.
.
.
This is equivalent to
.
An outer estimate of  can be determined using linear methods.

In contrast to traditional methods, the interval method approaches the result by containing the zeros. This guarantees that the result produces all zeros in the initial range.

The method converges on all zeros in the starting region. Division by zero can lead to separation of distinct zeros, though the separation may not be complete; it can be complemented by the bisection method.

As an example, consider the function , the starting range , and the point . We then have  and the first Newton step gives.
.

The result then produces intervals containing .

Bisection and covers

The various interval methods deliver conservative results as dependencies between the sizes of different intervals extensions are not taken into account. However, the dependency problem becomes less significant for narrower intervals.

Covering an interval vector  by smaller boxes  so that

is then valid for the range of values.

So, for the interval extensions described above the following holds:

Since  is often a genuine superset of the right-hand side, this usually leads to an improved estimate.

Such a cover can be generated by the bisection method such as thick elements   of the interval vector  by splitting in the center into the two intervals  and  If the result is still not suitable then further gradual subdivision is possible. A cover of  intervals results from  divisions of vector elements, substantially increasing the computation costs.

With very wide intervals, it can be helpful to split all intervals into several subintervals with a constant (and smaller) width, a method known as mincing. This then avoids the calculations for intermediate bisection steps. Both methods are only suitable for problems of low dimension.

Application
Interval arithmetic can be used in various areas (such as set inversion, motion planning, set estimation or stability analysis) to treat estimates with no exact numerical value.

Rounding error analysis
Interval arithmetic is used with error analysis, to control rounding errors arising from each calculation. The advantage of interval arithmetic is that after each operation there is an interval that reliably includes the true result. The distance between the interval boundaries gives the current calculation of rounding errors directly:
 Error =  for a given interval .
Interval analysis adds to rather than substituting for traditional methods for error reduction, such as pivoting.

Tolerance analysis
Parameters for which no exact figures can be allocated often arise during the simulation of technical and physical processes. The production process of technical components allows certain tolerances, so some parameters fluctuate within intervals. In addition, many fundamental constants are not known precisely.

,
can be found by interval methods. This provides an alternative to traditional propagation of error analysis. Unlike point methods, such as Monte Carlo simulation, interval arithmetic methodology ensures that no part of the solution area can be overlooked. However, the result is always a worst-case analysis for the distribution of error, as other probability-based distributions are not considered.

Fuzzy interval arithmetic

Interval arithmetic can also be used with affiliation functions for fuzzy quantities as they are used in fuzzy logic. A distribution function assigns uncertainty, which can be understood as a further interval.

For fuzzy arithmetic only a finite number of discrete affiliation stages  are considered. The form of such a distribution for an indistinct value can then represented by a sequence of intervals.

The interval  corresponds exactly to the fluctuation range for the stage 

The appropriate distribution for a function  concerning indistinct values  and the corresponding sequences.

can be approximated by the sequence.

where

and can be calculated by interval methods. The value  corresponds to the result of an interval calculation.

Computer-assisted proof
Warwick Tucker used interval arithmetic in order to solve the 14th of Smale's problems, that is, to show that the Lorenz attractor is a strange attractor. Thomas Hales used interval arithmetic in order to solve the Kepler conjecture.

History
Interval arithmetic is not a completely new phenomenon in mathematics; it has appeared several times under different names in the course of history. For example, Archimedes calculated lower and upper bounds 223/71 < π < 22/7 in the 3rd century BC. Actual calculation with intervals has neither been as popular as other numerical techniques nor been completely forgotten.

Rules for calculating with intervals and other subsets of the real numbers were published in a 1931 work by Rosalind Cicely Young. A comprehensive paper on interval algebra in numerical analysis was published by Teruo Sunaga (1958).

The birth of modern interval arithmetic was marked by the appearance of the book Interval Analysis by Ramon E. Moore in 1966. He had the idea in spring 1958, and a year later he published an article about computer interval arithmetic. Its merit was that starting with a simple principle, it provided a general method for automated error analysis, not just errors resulting from rounding.

Independently in 1956, Mieczyslaw Warmus suggested formulae for calculations with intervals, though Moore found the first non-trivial applications.

For example,  explored more effective implementations, while improved containment procedures for the solution set of systems of equations were due to Arnold Neumaier among others. In the 1960s, Eldon R. Hansen dealt with interval extensions for linear equations and then provided crucial contributions to global optimization, including what is now known as Hansen's method, perhaps the most widely used interval algorithm. Classical methods in this often have the problem of determining the largest (or smallest) global value, but could only find a local optimum and could not find better values; Helmut Ratschek and Jon George Rokne developed branch and bound methods, which until then had only applied to integer values, by using intervals to provide applications for continuous values.

In 1988, Rudolf Lohner developed Fortran-based software for reliable solutions for initial value problems using ordinary differential equations.

The journal Reliable Computing (originally Interval Computations) has been published since the 1990s, dedicated to the reliability of computer-aided computations. As lead editor, R. Baker Kearfott, in addition to his work on global optimization, has contributed significantly to the unification of notation and terminology used in interval arithmetic.

In recent years work has concentrated in particular on the estimation of preimages of parameterized functions and to robust control theory by the COPRIN working group of INRIA in Sophia Antipolis in France.

Implementations
There are many software packages that permit the development of numerical applications using interval arithmetic. These are usually provided in the form of program libraries.  There are also C++ and Fortran compilers that handle interval data types and suitable operations as a language extension, so interval arithmetic is supported directly.

Since 1967, Extensions for Scientific Computation (XSC) have been developed in the University of Karlsruhe for various programming languages, such as C++, Fortran and Pascal. The first platform was a Zuse Z23, for which a new interval data type with appropriate elementary operators was made available. There followed in 1976, Pascal-SC, a Pascal variant on a Zilog Z80 that it made possible to create fast, complicated routines for automated result verification. Then came the Fortran 77-based ACRITH-XSC for the System/370 architecture (FORTRAN-SC), which was later delivered by IBM. Starting from 1991 one could produce code for C compilers with Pascal-XSC; a year later the C++ class library supported C-XSC on many different computer systems. In 1997, all XSC variants were made available under the GNU General Public License. At the beginning of 2000 C-XSC 2.0 was released under the leadership of the working group for scientific computation at the Bergische University of Wuppertal to correspond to the improved C++ standard.

Another C++-class library was created in 1993 at the Hamburg University of Technology called Profil/BIAS (Programmer's Runtime Optimized Fast Interval Library, Basic Interval Arithmetic), which made the usual interval operations more user friendly. It emphasized the efficient use of hardware, portability and independence of a particular presentation of intervals.

The Boost collection of C++ libraries contains a template class for intervals. Its authors are aiming to have interval arithmetic in the standard C++ language.

The Frink programming language has an implementation of interval arithmetic that handles arbitrary-precision numbers. Programs written in Frink can use intervals without rewriting or recompilation.

GAOL is another C++ interval arithmetic library that is unique in that it offers the relational interval operators used in interval constraint programming.

The Moore library is an efficient implementation of interval arithmetic in C++. It provides intervals with endpoints of arbitrary precision and is based on the concepts feature of C++.

The Julia programming language has an implementation of interval arithmetics along with high-level features, such as root-finding (for both real and complex-valued functions) and interval constraint programming, via the ValidatedNumerics.jl package.

In addition, computer algebra systems, such as FriCAS, Mathematica, Maple, Maxima (software) and MuPAD, can handle intervals. A Matlab extension Intlab'' builds on BLAS routines, and the Toolbox b4m makes a Profil/BIAS interface. Moreover, the Software Euler Math Toolbox includes an interval arithmetic.

A library for the functional language OCaml was written in assembly language and C.

IEEE 1788 standard

A standard for interval arithmetic, IEEE Std 1788-2015, has been approved in June 2015. Two reference implementations are freely available. These have been developed by members of the standard's working group: The libieeep1788 library for C++, and the interval package for GNU Octave.

A minimal subset of the standard, IEEE Std 1788.1-2017, has been approved in December 2017 and published in February 2018. It should be easier to implement and may speed production of implementations.

Conferences and workshops
Several international conferences or workshop take place every year in the world. The main conference is probably SCAN (International Symposium on Scientific Computing, Computer Arithmetic, and Verified Numerical Computation), but there is also SWIM (Small Workshop on Interval Methods), PPAM (International Conference on Parallel Processing and Applied Mathematics), REC (International Workshop on Reliable Engineering Computing).

See also
 Affine arithmetic
 INTLAB (Interval Laboratory)
 Automatic differentiation
 Multigrid method
 Monte-Carlo simulation
 Interval finite element
 Fuzzy number
 Significant figures
 Karlsruhe Accurate Arithmetic (KAA)
 Unum

References

Further reading
 
 
  (11 pages) (NB. About Triplex-ALGOL Karlsruhe, an ALGOL 60 (1963) implementation with support for triplex numbers.)

External links
 Interval arithmetic (Wolfram Mathworld)
 Validated Numerics for Pedestrians
 Interval Methods from Arnold Neumaier, University of Vienna
 SWIM (Summer Workshop on Interval Methods)
 International Conference on Parallel Processing and Applied Mathematics
 INTLAB, Institute for Reliable Computing , Hamburg University of Technology
 Ball arithmetic by Joris van der Hoeven
 kv - a C++ Library for Verified Numerical Computation
 
 Arb - a C library for arbitrary-precision ball arithmetic
 
 

Arithmetic
Computer arithmetic
Numerical analysis
Data types